Jon Grieve is an Australian former professional rugby league footballer who played in the 1990s. He played for Manly-Warringah and the Western Reds in the NSWRL/ARL and Super League competitions. He also played for Widnes in England.

Playing career
Grieve made his first grade debut for Manly in round 18 of the 1991 NSWRL season against Western Suburbs at Brookvale Oval. After having only played one match in the top grade, Grieve played in both finals games for Manly in the 1991 season against North Sydney and Canberra. Grieve played a further two years at Manly before signing with English side Widnes. In 1995, Grieve signed for the newly admitted Western Reds team where he played for three years including the 1997 Super League season when the club was renamed Perth Reds.

References

1970 births
Manly Warringah Sea Eagles players
Western Reds players
Widnes Vikings players
Australian rugby league players
Rugby league props
Rugby league second-rows
Living people